Orthodox Club, also known simply as Orthodox or Orthodox Amman, is a multi-sports club based in Amman. They are mainly known for their basketball team. The team was established in 1952 to compete in the Jordanian Premier Basketball League.

Honours

Domestic
 Jordanian Premier Basketball League
 Winners (25): 1959, 1973, 1976, 1977, 1978, 1979, 1981, 1982, 1983, 1984, 1985, 1986, 1987, 1988, 1989, 1991, 1995, 1996, 1998, 1999, 2000, 2001, 2002, 2011, 2014
 Jordan Cup
 Winners (7): 1982, 1987, 2000, 2001, 2008, 2015, 2022
 Jordan Super Cup
 Winners (1): 2002

Continental
 WABA Champions Cup
 Winners (1): 1999
 Antranik International Tournament
 Winners (1): 1991
 Al-Dustur International Tournament
 Winners (1): 1992
 Sagesse International Tournament
 Winners (1): 1993

Records

WABA Champions Cup
 1999: Winners
 2000: 4th place 
 2001: Runners-up 
 2002: Runners-up 
 2004: 4th place
 2008: 5th place
 2009: 6th place
 2016: 6th place

Asia Champions Cup
 1988: 5th place
 1996: 7th place
 1999: 6th place

Arab Club Basketball Championship
 1978: Runners-up 
 1990: 4th place
 2002: First round
 2008: 4th place

Al Midan Intl Tournament
 1993: Runners-up

Al Assad Intl Tournament
 1995: Runners-up

Jordan Intl Tournament
 2000: Runners-up

Al Hariri Tournament
 2007: Semi Final

Damascus International Tournament
 2007: Semi Final

References

Ghaleb Balawi, Jordanian Basketball History book, 2010

External links
Official Website 
Team profile at Asia-basket.com

Basketball teams in Jordan
1952 establishments in Jordan
Basketball teams established in 1952